Darkness is the absence of light.

Darkness or The Darkness may also refer to:

Film and television 
 Dark (TV series), a 2017 German-language TV series produced by Netflix
 Darkness, a character from the anime Konosuba
 Darkness (1916 film), an Italian silent film
 Darkness (1923 film), a British silent crime film
 Darkness (1993 film), an American independent horror film
 Darkness (2002 film), an English-language horror film
 Darkness, a 2009 Czech film directed by Juraj Herz
 Darkness (2015 film), a Serbian film
 Darkness (2019 film), an Italian drama film
 "Darkness" (The Secret Circle), an episode of The Secret Circle
 "Darkness" (Stargate Universe), an episode of the TV series Stargate Universe
 The Darkness, a name for one of the man-eating lions in The Ghost and the Darkness (1996), a historical adventure film
 The Darkness is the source of destruction of Wonderland in the animated film Wonder Park
 The Darkness (film), a 2016 American independent horror film
 The Darkness (Supernatural), known as Amara in human form, a dark evil in the eleventh season of Supernatural

Literature 
 "Darkness" (poem), a poem by Lord Byron
 Darkness (short stories), a collection of stories by Bharati Mukherjee
 Darkness (novel), by John Saul, 1991
 The Darkness (comics), a comics series published by Top Cow/Image Comics
 The Darkness (novel), a 2000 novel by Anthony Eaton
 "The Darkness", a short story by David Drake
 The Darkness Series, a novel series by Harry Turtledove
 Darknesses, a novel in The Corean Chronicles by L. E. Modesitt, Jr.
 Darkness (KonoSuba), a character in the light novel series KonoSuba

Music 
 The Darkness (band), a British rock band
 The Darkness (album), a 2015 album by Twiztid
 Darkness, a German Eurodance act featuring Nana
 "Darkness" (Aerosmith song)
 "Darkness" (Darren Hayes song)
 "Darkness" (Eminem song)
 "Darkness", a song by Black Uhuru from Chill Out
 "Darkness", a song by Disturbed from Believe
 "Darkness", a song by Lamb from Between Darkness and Wonder
 "Darkness", a song by Leonard Cohen from Old Ideas
 "Darkness", a song by Rage Against the Machine from The Crow film soundtrack
 "Darkness", a song by SPF 1000 used in the animated TV series The Grim Adventures of Billy & Mandy
 "Darkness", a song by Third Eye Blind from Blue
 "Darkness", a song by The Police from Ghost in the Machine
 "Darkness", a song by The Human League from Dare
 "Darkness", a song by Peter Gabriel from Up
 "Darkness", a song by Jolin Tsai from Magic

Other uses 
 The Darkness (video game), a video game based on the comics
 The Darkness II, video game and sequel to The Darkness
 Darkness, a horse that ran in the 2009 Grand National

See also 
 
 
 Darkness, Darkness (disambiguation)
 Prince of Darkness (disambiguation)
 World of Darkness (disambiguation)